The flag of the Federal Territories of Malaysia consists of three horizontal bars of yellow, blue, and red, with the coat of arms of Malaysia in the middle. It was officially adopted on 23 May 2006.

History 
Prior to the adoption of the flag, the three directly governed territories of Kuala Lumpur, Putrajaya and Labuan had utilized the flag of Kuala Lumpur to represent the Federal Territories as a collective unit, which was deemed inappropriate. The Cabinet of Malaysia first decided to adopt an official flag representing them collectively on 3 May 2006. The government had already sought the consent of the Yang di-Pertuan Agong Mizan Zainal Abidin on 12 May 2005 a year prior to the act.

The flag of the Federal Territories was first unveiled by Federal Territories Minister Zulhasnan Rafique on 23 May 2006 and launched on 20 August 2006. A series of performances by celebrities and schools were planned to be held at Merdeka Square, Kuala Lumpur to commemorate the launch. Deputy Prime Minister Najib Razak justified the new flag in a speech proclaiming the "common direction" of the three Federal Territories. The flag of the Federal Territories was to be used only when representing them collectively; otherwise, their individual flags remained in force.

The government has since encouraged residents of the three Federal Territories to fly the flag on 1 February to commemorate Federal Territory Day.

Symbolism 

The flag has three colours: yellow to represent respect, sovereignty and honour, red for strength and blue for unity, sincerity and harmony. The three stars below the coat of arms of Malaysia stand for the three territories, supporting their mission to become important administrative and business centres.

Flags of the Federal Territories

See also 
 Flag of Colombia
 Flag of Ecuador
 Flag of Gran Colombia
 Flag of Venezuela

References

Flags of Malaysia
Flag
Flags including Arabic script
Federal Territories
2006 establishments in Malaysia
Flags displaying animals